Air Vice Marshal Augustus Henry Orlebar,  (17 February 1897 – 4 August 1943) was a British Army and Royal Air Force officer who served in both world wars.

After being wounded during the Gallipoli campaign, Orlebar was seconded to the Royal Flying Corps and subsequently the Royal Air Force (RAF).  He formally transferred to the RAF after the First World War and between the wars was involved in high speed flying, commanding the High Speed Flight RAF, competing in the Schneider Trophy, and holding the world air speed record.

By the outbreak of the Second World War Orlebar was in command of RAF Northolt. He briefly became Director of Flying Training in 1940 before going to HQ RAF Fighter Command. In July 1941 he became Air Officer Commanding, No. 10 (Fighter) Group, and in March 1943 Deputy Chief of Combined Operations. He fell ill, and died in hospital on 4 August 1943.

Early life
Orlebar was the son of Augustus Scobell Orlebar and Hester Mary Orlebar, of Podington, Bedfordshire. The Orlebars were an old established family, having built Hinwick House almost 200 years earlier, after holding the manor since the mid-17th century. He was educated at Rugby School.

First World War
Orlebar was commissioned as a second lieutenant in 1/5th Battalion, Bedfordshire Regiment (Territorial Force) on 15 January 1915. His battalion landed at Suvla Bay on 11 August 1915, pitching him into the Gallipoli campaign, He was promoted to temporary lieutenant on 21 September 1915, but was subsequently wounded in action by a sniper's bullet. He was then invalided to the United Kingdom and seconded to the Royal Flying Corps (RFC) on recovery.

Orlebar trained as a pilot in 1916 and was appointed a flying officer in the military wing of the RFC on 17 September 1916 when he was formally seconded from his regimental duties to the RFC. His rank of lieutenant was confirmed on 21 October. He was posted to No. 19 Squadron RFC on the Western Front. On 13 March 1918 he shot down and severely wounded Ltn. Lothar von Richthofen (brother of Manfred von Richthofen), near Cambrai. He was wounded in turn himself by Albatros scouts over Ham on 23 March 1918. Before his return to combat, he also served as an instructor in Essex.

Orlebar was credited with two enemy aircraft destroyed whilst serving with No 19 and a further four as a flight commander in No 73 Squadron, before being wounded.  He gained his final victory with No. 43 Squadron on 29 September, bringing his total to seven.

Inter-war service
Orlebar served as a test pilot at the Aeroplane and Armament Experimental Establishment (A&AEE), Martlesham Heath, between 1919 and 1925, being awarded the Air Force Cross in 1921 and the bar in 1929.

Air racing
Orlebar was Officer Commanding and pilot with the High Speed Flight, the RAF's team for the Schneider Trophy seaplane races of 1927–1931. Britain, having won the 1927 race, became the subsequent host for the contests, which were based at RAF Calshot on the eastern entrance to Southampton Water.

In 1929 Orlebar set an air speed record of 357.7 mph in Supermarine S.6 N247.

The final contest was held in 1931, for a 3rd win gave the title to Britain in perpetuity. His report on the contest describes Flight Lieutenant George Stainforth's achievement of a new speed record at over 400 mph.

Second World War
At the outbreak of the Second World War Orlebar was the Director of Flying Training before joining the Air Staff, HQ Fighter Command in October 1940.  On 22 July 1941 he became Air Officer Commanding of No. 10 Group then the position of Deputy Chief of Combined Operations, at RAF Northolt from 2 March 1943. He died in hospital from natural causes after a short illness and is buried at his family church of Saint Mary's, Podington, Bedfordshire. He is commemorated on the War Memorial of the Church.

Service career

Decorations
Air Force Cross – 2 Jan 1922, Bar – 3 Jun 1930, Mentioned in Despatches – 24 Sep 1941.

Ranks held

Service record

Army

Royal Flying Corps

RAF

References

External links
Medal group of A H Orlebar, RAF Museum.

Graduates of the Royal College of Defence Studies
Burials in Bedfordshire
Bedfordshire and Hertfordshire Regiment officers
Royal Flying Corps officers
British Army personnel of World War I
Royal Air Force personnel of World War I
Royal Air Force air marshals of World War II
Commanders of the Order of the British Empire
Recipients of the Air Force Cross (United Kingdom)
People educated at Rugby School
1897 births
1943 deaths
English aviators
British air racers
Schneider Trophy pilots
British aviation record holders
Royal Air Force personnel killed in World War II
Military personnel from Bedfordshire